Lovćen is a mountain and national park in southwestern Montenegro.

Lovćen may also refer to:
 Lovćen (cigarette)
 FK Lovćen
 ŽFK Lovćen
 KK Lovćen
 RK Lovćen
 Rugby Club Lovćen
 Lovćen Brigade